Cyperus semiochraceus is a species of sedge that is found in parts of Central America.

The species was first formally described by the botanist Johann Otto Boeckeler in 1878.

See also 
 List of Cyperus species

References 

semiochraceus
Taxa named by Johann Otto Boeckeler
Plants described in 1878
Flora of Belize
Flora of Mexico
Flora of Guatemala
Flora of Nicaragua